Rhinella multiverrucosa is a species of toad in the family Bufonidae (Lehr 2006). It is endemic to Peru. Its natural habitat is subtropical or tropical moist montane forests. It is threatened by habitat loss.

References

multiverrucosa
Amphibians of Peru
Amphibians of the Andes
Taxonomy articles created by Polbot
Amphibians described in 2005